The Hildebrand & Wolfmüller was the world's first production motorcycle. Heinrich and Wilhelm Hildebrand were steam-engine engineers before they teamed up with Alois Wolfmüller to produce their internal combustion Motorrad in Munich in 1894.

Mechanical details

It produced  @ 240 rpm propelling a weight of  up to a maximum speed of .The fuel-air mixture from the surface carburettor was regulated by a valve operated by controls on the handlebar. The engine, which was positioned flat in the frame, used hot tube ignition with the tube heater in front of the cylinder heads. The tube heater was ventilated by the lower downtubes while the upper downtubes held lubricating oil.

Some design details were carried over from a steam-powered prototype made by the Hildebrand brothers in 1889, including the water tank shaped to form the rear mudguard and the connecting rods of the engine driving the rear wheel directly. The water tank was repurposed to supply water to the cooling jackets surrounding the cylinders. The steam-powered prototype had a double-acting cylinder, applying power to the piston in both directions. With no double action available in the petrol engine, and no flywheel effect apart from the movement of the rear wheel, the return impulse for the piston was provided by heavy rubber bands.

The intake valves were operated by the suction caused by the intake stroke, while the exhaust valves were operated by an eccentric brass ring on the rear wheel and a device at the cylinder head that opened each cylinder's valve alternately.

Production run
Approximately two thousand examples of this motorcycle were built, but with a high initial purchase price and fierce competition from improving designs (this model was entirely "run and jump" with neither clutch nor pedals) it is not thought to have been a great commercial success. The Hildebrand & Wolfmüller factory closed in 1919 after the First World War. The motorcycle was also built under licence in Paris by Duncan and Superbie.

Survivors

Examples exist today in the Deutsches Zweirad- und NSU-Museum in Neckarsulm, Germany, the Science Museum in London, The Henry Ford in Detroit, Michigan, the Museum Lalu Lintas in Surabaya, Indonesia, National Technical Museum in Prague, and the Barber Vintage Motorsports Museum in Birmingham, Alabama, USA. Until 2011, the Wells Auto Museum in Wells, Maine listed an 1894 Wolfmuller in their collection.

Notes

References

See also
List of motorcycles of the 1890s

External links 

 

 
 

Manufacturing companies of Germany
Motorcycle manufacturers of Germany
Motorcycles introduced in the 1890s